Elections to the Odisha Legislative Assembly were held on March 27, 1952. This election was officially known as the 1951 Odisha Legislative Assembly election, even though through delays, actual voting didn't take place until early 1952.

Political parties
6 National parties along with All India Ganatantra Parishad and 3 registered unrecognized parties took part in the assembly election. Indian National Congress emerged as the single largest party while All India Gantantra Parishad emerged as the main opponent to the Congress party.

Results

!colspan=10|
|-
! colspan="2" style="text-align:left;" | Parties
! Flag
! Seats Contested
! Seats Won
! Votes
! % of Votes
|-
! colspan="7" style="text-align:left;" | National Parties
|-
| bgcolor="" |
| style="text-align:left;" | Communist Party of India
| 
| 33
| 7
| 2,06,757
| 5.62%
|-
| bgcolor="" |
| style="text-align:left;" | Forward Bloc (Marxist Group)
| 
| 2
| 1
| 12,874
| 0.35%
|-
| bgcolor="" |
| style="text-align:left;" | Forward Bloc (Ruikar Group)
| 
| 1
| 0
| 2,779
| 0.08%
|-
| bgcolor="" |
| style="text-align:left;" | Indian National Congress
| 
| 135
| 67
| 13,92,501
| 37.87%
|-
| bgcolor="" |
| style="text-align:left;" | Kisan Mazdoor Praja Party
| 
| 7
| 0
| 16,948
| 0.46%
|-
| bgcolor="" |
| style="text-align:left;" | Socialist Party
| 
| 79
| 10
| 4,32,731
| 11.77%
|-
! colspan="7" style="text-align:left;" | State Parties
|-
| bgcolor="" |
| style="text-align:left;" | All India Ganatantra Parishad
| 
| 58
| 31
| 7,53,685
| 20.50%
|-
! colspan="7" style="text-align:left;" | Registered (Unrecognised) Parties
|-
| bgcolor="" |
| style="text-align:left;" | Peoples Independent Party
| 
| 1
| 0
| 11,895
| 0.32%
|-
| bgcolor="" |
| style="text-align:left;" | Pursharathi Panchayat
| 
| 1
| 0
| 1,841
| 0.05%
|-
| bgcolor="" |
| style="text-align:left;" | Radical Democrat Party
| 
| 1
| 0
| 1,589
| 0.04%
|-
! colspan="7" style="text-align:left;" | Independents
|-
| bgcolor="" |
| style="text-align:left;" | Independent
| 
| 204
| 24
| 8,43,446
| 22.94%
|-
! colspan="4" | Total
! 140
! 36,77,046
! 100%
|-
|}

Winners

Government Formation
In these elections, Congress emerged as the largest party, but did not get majority to form the government. Nabakrushna Choudhuri of the Congress party became the first Chief Minister of Odisha, after a series of re-alignments among independents.

See also
 1951–52 elections in India
 1957 Odisha Legislative Assembly election

References

State Assembly elections in Odisha
Orissa
1950s in Orissa
March 1952 events in Asia